is a Japanese actress, voice actress and singer from Sapporo, Hokkaido, who is affiliated with Stardust Promotion. She is known for playing Sailor Mercury in two stage play adaptations of Sailor Moon in 2014 and 2015, and for playing Karen Aijō, the protagonist of the multimedia franchise Revue Starlight. She is also a member of the musical group .

On April 23, 2020, it was announced Koyama will take a hiatus in May due to vocal cord surgery.

Biography
Koyama was born in Hokkaido on November 30, 1995. Her mother is a nursery teacher. From an early age, she had an interest in acting, particularly after becoming familiar with stage play adaptations of the manga series Sailor Moon; it would become her dream to perform in a play of the series.

Koyama became affiliated with the Sapporo-based acting office Egg in 2007, and she would begin performing in several theatrical plays in Hokkaido. In 2014, she was cast as Sailor Mercury in the stage musical Sailor Moon: Petite Étrangère, and she would reprise the role the following year in the stage musical Sailor Moon: Un Nouveau Voyage. At some point in her career, as she was unsure of what her future held, she considered retiring from acting and pursuing a different career. Following a recommendation from the director of the Sailor Moon stage plays, who was surprised to hear that she was not a voice actress, she decided to try out voice acting. After passing an audition held by the talent agency Stardust Promotion, she became affiliated with them in 2017 and moved to Tokyo.

In 2017, Koyama was cast as Karen Aijō, the protagonist of the multimedia franchise Revue Starlight. Her participation in the series began when she played Karen in the franchise's stage play, which was initially performed at the AiiA 2.5 Theater in Tokyo; she would then reprise the role in the 2018 anime television series. To promote the series, she appeared at panels at C3 AFA Singapore, and CharaExpo USA in 2018. She has also been cast as the character Haruka Shima in the multimedia franchise Onsen Musume. In 2019, she and two other voice actresses from Hokkaido, Miharu Hanai and Reia Hayasaka, started hosting a radio program on STV Radio.

In 2020, she played the role of Elma in Interspecies Reviewers.

Filmography

Stage plays

Anime

Video games

References

External links
Official agency profile 

1995 births
Living people
Japanese women pop singers
Japanese stage actresses
Japanese video game actresses
Japanese voice actresses
Japanese child actresses
Stardust Promotion artists
Starlight 99-gumi members
Voice actresses from Sapporo
21st-century Japanese actresses
21st-century Japanese singers
21st-century Japanese women singers